Yazlık is a village in the Aydıntepe District, Bayburt Province, Turkey. Its population is 25 (2021).

It was previously known by its Greek name Livera.

References

Villages in Aydıntepe District